The Examiner is the daily newspaper of eastern Jackson County, Missouri, including Independence, Blue Springs and Grain Valley. It is published five days a week – Tuesday through Saturday – and its webpage is at www.examiner.net.

The Examiner was first published as a weekly newspaper in 1898 by Col. William Southern. The daily edition began publication as The Independence Examiner May 16, 1905.  The official Examiner website was launched in 1996.

The paper was formerly owned by Stauffer Communications, which was acquired by Morris Communications in 1995. Morris sold the paper, along with 13 others, to GateHouse Media in 2007.

Audrey Stubbart, an American centenarian, worked for The Examiner until the age of 104.

References
Examiner [Independence], 27 June 2006: 4A.

External links
 Official Examiner Website
 Mondo page
 Morris subsidiary profile of The Examiner

Newspapers published in Missouri
Jackson County, Missouri
Publications established in 1898
1898 establishments in Missouri
Gannett publications
Mass media in the Kansas City metropolitan area